George Ridgwell (1867–1935) was a British screenwriter and film director of the silent film era. His name was sometimes spelt as George Ridgewell. He was born in Woolwich in 1867. He directed around 70 films including a series of adaptations of Sherlock Holmes stories featuring Eille Norwood as Holmes. His last film was Lily of Killarney in 1929. He died in Hampstead in 1935. He was the father of the actress Audrey Ridgewell.

His early career was as an army musician (sergeant, band of the Coldstream Guards) and on the stage (he created the role of Abdallah in Sullivan's 'Rose of Persia' and was a member of The D'Oyly Carte Touring Opera Company for a season playing lead baritone roles). He also composed light music numbers and lyrics. He was educated at the Royal Military Asylum, later the Duke of York's Royal Military School (a school history is the source of this information. Also see G&S Archive).

Selected filmography
Director
 The Mystery of Room 13 (1915)
 The Water Lily (1919)
Fruits of Passion (1919) 
 The Sword of Damocles (1920)
 Greatheart (1921)
 The Four Just Men (1921)
 The Amazing Partnership (1921)
 Petticoat Loose (1922)
 The Missioner (1922)
 The Knight Errant (1922)
 His Last Bow (1923)
 The Notorious Mrs. Carrick (1924)
 Lily of Killarney (1929)

Actor
 The Crime at Blossoms (1933)
 Channel Crossing (1933)

References

1867 births
1935 deaths
British film directors
British male screenwriters
20th-century British screenwriters